Richard Hayes (aka Dharmacārī Dayāmati) (born 1945) is an Emeritus professor of Buddhist philosophy at the University of New Mexico. He received his Ph.D. in Sanskrit and Indian studies from the University of Toronto in 1982. Hayes moved to Canada in 1967 in order to avoid being drafted for the Vietnam War.

Hayes is a noted scholar in the field of Buddhist Sanskrit, specializing in the study of Dharmakīrti and Dignāga.

Hayes was formerly Associate Professor of religious studies at McGill University in Canada. He joined the University of New Mexico in the fall of 2003  and retired in 2013.

Hayes was co-founder, moderator and a prolific contributor to the online discussion group Buddha-L. Buddha-L attracted a mix of scholars and amateurs and hosted vigorous and at times acrimonious debates.

As well as teaching Buddhism and Sanskrit, Hayes is himself a Buddhist and a Quaker. In a brief blog bio he says he was "Initiated as a dharmachari with the name Dayāmati into the Triratna Buddhist Order on January 26, 2000. I am also a member of Albuquerque Monthly Meeting of the Religious Society of Friends (Quakers)." Hayes is a noted essayist (Land of No Buddha) and blogger (New City of Friends, Out of a Living Silence https://dayamati.blog) of considerable wit and clarity. He has expressed vehement political opinions, and been critical in particular of Republican politicians. His website "Inquiring Buddhist" is at http://dayamati.org.

Books

References

External links
Prof. Hayes site at The University of New Mexico
New City of Friends - Richard Hayes' blog
publication list
Audio recording of Richard Hayes lecture on "Self: Myth, Delusion, Fiction, or Prerequisite?" at the University of Chicago

1945 births
American Quakers
People from New Mexico
American Buddhist studies scholars
Buddhist writers
University of Toronto alumni
University of New Mexico faculty
20th-century Quakers
Living people
Linguists from the United States